Turtle Flip Over is a turtle turnover demonstrated in The Essence Of Judo by Kyuzo Mifune, and it is an unnamed technique described in The Canon Of Judo. It is not recognized as an official technique by the Kodokan, however, it falls under the classification of Katame-waza (grappling technique).

Technique description 
The main characteristic of the Turtle Flip Over is
tori's lift of uke's one side to turn uke.

Included systems 
 Judo
 Brazilian jiu-jitsu

See also 
 Judo techniques by type

References 

Judo technique